Luke Greenfield (born February 5, 1972) is an American film director, producer, and screenwriter.  He is best known for directing the 2004 film The Girl Next Door.  Greenfield directed the pilot episode of the television series Aliens in America and produced the film Role Models. In 2014, he co-wrote, produced and directed the film Let's Be Cops.

Early life
Greenfield was born in Manhasset, New York and was raised in Westport, Connecticut. After graduating from Staples High School, he next attended USC School of Cinema-Television where he made several student films including "Alive & Kicking," which won awards at many film festivals.

He is Jewish.

Career
In 1999, Greenfield co-wrote and directed the short film, The Right Hook. Adam Sandler and producers, Todd Garner and Greg Silverman, saw an early cut of the short and gave Greenfield his first opportunity to direct a studio feature called The Animal starring Rob Schneider. It was also Greenfield's first experience to direct a film he didn't write or co-write the screenplay himself.

Immediately after The Animal, Greenfield went back to creating and directing his own material with the coming-of-age film, The Girl Next Door. The film was a breakout surprise for audiences and the studios as well. It was a teen comedy that transformed into a character journey combining comedy with realistic danger and poignant emotional moments.

In 2004, Greenfield created his film and TV production company, WideAwake, Inc., which gave Greenfield his first foray into television. He directed the television pilot, Aliens in America for NBC/Universal Studios and the CW Network.

At New Regency, Greenfield created a few of his passion projects, including the comedy, Role Models, which he produced for Universal Pictures.

Greenfield was then approached by producer Molly Smith to direct the film adaptation of the best-selling novel, Something Borrowed. The film was released by Warner Brothers in May 2011. The film received negative reviews but became a cult hit and the studio is now developing the sequel.

Greenfield went back to directing his own material with the action-comedy, Let's Be Cops, a film he co-wrote, directed and produced at 20th Century Fox. Let’s Be Cops opened on August 13, 2014.

Filmography

Film

Producer
 Role Models (2008)
 Let's Be Cops (2014)

Television
TV movies
 Go Sick (2002)
 House Broken (2006) (Also producer)
 52 Fights (2006)
 The Law (2009)

TV series

References

External links
 

1972 births
Living people
People from Manhasset, New York
People from Westport, Connecticut
Film directors from Connecticut
Jewish American film directors
Jewish American film producers
American male film actors
American television directors
Comedy film directors
USC School of Cinematic Arts alumni